Joílson Júnior de Brito Ramos (born 19 April 1998) is a Brazilian Greco-Roman wrestler. He is a six-time medalist at the Pan American Wrestling Championships. He also won the gold medal in his event at the 2018 South American Games.

Career 

In 2019, he represented Brazil at the Pan American Games in the 67 kg event where he was eliminated in his first match by Ellis Coleman.

At the 2020 Pan American Wrestling Championships held in Ottawa, Canada, he won the silver medal in the 72 kg event. A year earlier, he won one of the bronze medals in the 67 kg event.

He competed in the 77kg event at the 2022 World Wrestling Championships held in Belgrade, Serbia. He won the silver medal in his event at the 2022 South American Games held in Asunción, Paraguay.

Achievements

References

External links 

 

Living people
1998 births
Place of birth missing (living people)
Brazilian male sport wrestlers
Pan American Games competitors for Brazil
Wrestlers at the 2019 Pan American Games
Competitors at the 2018 South American Games
Competitors at the 2022 South American Games
South American Games medalists in wrestling
South American Games gold medalists for Brazil
South American Games silver medalists for Brazil
Pan American Wrestling Championships medalists
21st-century Brazilian people